Brazdat is a 1973 Albanian drama film directed by Kristaq Dhamo and written by Dhimitër Xhuvani.

Cast
 Astrit Çerma
 Besa Imami
 Muhamet Sherri
 Pandi Siku
 Elida Topçiu
 Suzana Zekthi

External links
 

1973 films
1973 drama films
Albanian-language films
Films directed by Kristaq Dhamo
Albanian drama films